The Great Southern and Western Railway (GS&WR) Class 341 consisted of a single 4-4-0 express passenger locomotive named Sir William Goulding introduced in 1913 for the Dublin—Cork route.  Despite being an apparently capable design it was withdrawn in 1928.

Design
Design was begun by Robert Coey who retired through ill health and completed by Richard Maunsell who was later to design the UK Southern Railway Schools 4-4-0. Equipped with a large diameter boiler and Schmidt superheater.  It was unique for the GS&WR and its successor the GSR in having inside Walschaerts valve gear. This design was at the limit achievable by a 4-4-0 within the axle weight restriction limits and it was weighed regularly to ensure compliance.  The only change to the initial design was a later reduction in cylinder diameter

Service
Due to weight restrictions it served on the Dublin—Cork route only where from 1916 it later shared services with the new EA Watson designed 400 Class 4-6-0 against which engine 341 seems to have compared favourably.

Withdrawal
The locomotive was withdrawn in 1928 after just 15 years, three 400 class express locomotives were also retired shortly afterwards as surplus to requirements.

Model
There is a detailed O Gauge model of engine 341 in the Fry model railway collection.

References

4-4-0 locomotives
5 ft 3 in gauge locomotives
Railway locomotives introduced in 1913
Scrapped locomotives
Steam locomotives of Ireland